There are possibly more than 100 archaeological or historic ruins in North Macedonia. Civilizations in the past left behind many structures such as castles, fortresses, churches, and aqueducts. Ruins can be seen today all over the Macedonian countryside. Factors such as environmental changes, changes in settlements, populations, migrations, and changes in neighbouring colonies or tribes, all played a key role in the movement of people within the region of Macedonia.

Archaeological sites in North Macedonia 

Below is a list of sites and their locations :

Historic sites in North Macedonia 

Below is a list of sites and their locations :

- Plaosnik located in Ohrid. 

- St Panteleimon located in Ohrid.

References 

1^ www.macedonia-timeless.com 

Archaeological sites in North Macedonia
Historic sites in North Macedonia